The behavioral sciences explore the cognitive processes within organisms and the behavioral interactions between organisms in the natural world. It involves the systematic analysis and investigation of human and animal behavior through naturalistic observation, controlled scientific experimentation and mathematical modeling. It attempts to accomplish legitimate, objective conclusions through rigorous formulations and observation. Examples of behavioral sciences include psychology, psychobiology, anthropology, economics, and cognitive science. Generally, behavioral science primarily seeks to generalize about human behavior as it relates to society and its impact on society as a whole.

Categories
Behavioral sciences include two broad categories: neural Information sciences and social Relational sciences.

Information processing sciences deal with information processing of stimuli from the social environment by cognitive entities in order to engage in decision making, social judgment and social perception for individual functioning and survival of organism in a social environment. These include psychology, cognitive science, behavior analysis,  psychobiology, neural networks, social cognition, social psychology, semantic networks, ethology, and social neuroscience.

On the other hand, Relational sciences deal with relationships, interaction, communication networks, associations and relational strategies or dynamics between organisms or cognitive entities in a social system. These include fields like sociological social psychology, social networks, dynamic network analysis, agent-based model,  behavior analysis, and  microsimulation.

Applications
Insights from several pure disciplines across behavioral sciences are explored by various applied disciplines and practiced in the context of everyday life and business. 

Consumer behavior, for instance, is the study of the decision making process consumers make when purchasing goods or services. It studies the way consumers recognize problems and discover solutions. Behavioral science is applied in this study by examining the patterns consumers make when making purchases, the factors that influenced those decisions, and how to take advantage of these patterns.

Organizational behavior is the application of behavioral science in a business setting. It studies what motivates employees, how to make them work more effectively, what influences this behavior, and how to use these patterns in order to achieve the company's goals. Managers often use organizational behavior to better lead their employees.

Using insights from psychology and economics, behavioral science can be leveraged to understand how individuals make decisions regarding their health and ultimately reduce disease burden through interventions such as loss aversion, framing, defaults, nudges, and more. The University of Pennsylvania’s Center for Health Incentives & Behavioral Economics uses behavioral science to inform health policy; improve health care delivery; and increase healthy behavior in areas such as physical activity, vaccine uptake, medication adherence, smoking cessation, and food choice.

Other applied disciplines of behavioral science include operations research and media psychology.

Differentiation from social sciences 
The terms behavioral sciences and social sciences are interconnected fields that both study systematic processes of behavior, but they differ on their level of scientific analysis for various dimensions of behavior.

Behavioral sciences abstract empirical data to investigate the decision process and communication strategies within and between organisms in a social system. This characteristically involves fields like psychology, social neuroscience, ethology, and cognitive science. In contrast, social sciences provide a perceptive framework to study the processes of a social system through impacts of a social organization on the structural adjustment of the individual and of groups. They typically include fields like sociology, economics,  public health, anthropology, demography, and political science.

Many subfields of these disciplines test the boundaries between behavioral and social sciences. For example, political psychology and behavioral economics use behavioral approaches, despite the predominant focus on systemic and institutional factors in the broader fields of political science and economics.

History 

Behavioral Science began being studied predominantly in the early 1900s. One of the pioneers of the study is John B Watson. He began teaching as a professor of psychology at Johns Hopkins University in 1908. In 1915 he served as the president of the American Psychological Association (APA). Some of his methods in studying behavioral science have been controversial. One of these instances was the "Little Albert" experiment. This experiment was to condition a child to fear a white rat. The fear also translated to other furry white things. This was done by associating the objects with a loud clanging noise. A point that drew controversy is that the child was never de-conditioned. In 1957 he received the APA's Award for Distinguished Scientific Contributions and discoveries.

In 2009, behavioral scientists conducted a report on loss aversion (Gächter et al., 2009). The research concluded that the pain of losing is psychologically twice as powerful as the pleasure of gaining. Behavioral scientists use loss aversion now in studying human behavior. It has helped show why in some instances penalty frames are more effective than reward frames in motivating human behavior.

See also

 Behaviour
 Human behavior
 List of academic disciplines
 Science
 Fields of science
 Natural sciences
 Social sciences
 History of science
 History of technology

References

Selected bibliography
 George Devereux: From anxiety to method in the behavioral sciences, The Hague, Paris. Mouton & Co, 1967
 
 E.D. Klemke, R. Hollinger & A.D. Kline, (eds.) (1980). Introductory Readings in the Philosophy of Science. Prometheus Books, New York.
 Neil J. Smelser & Paul B. Baltes, eds. (2001). International Encyclopedia of the Social & Behavioral Sciences,  26 v. Oxford: Elsevier.

External links
 

 
Cognitive science